Wester Hailes railway station is a railway station opened in 1987 by British Rail serving Wester Hailes in the city of Edinburgh, Scotland. It is located on the Edinburgh branch of the West Coast Main Line, but is not served by inter-city services - these are provided via the Shotts Line of the SPT network. The station has two platforms, connected by a stairway footbridge, and CCTV to deter crime and anti-social behaviour. It is managed by ScotRail.

The staple passenger traction calling at this station is the Class 156 "Super Sprinter". As this station is part of the West Coast Main Line to Carstairs, which diverges at Mid Calder Junction, a colourful variety of CrossCountry Class 220 "Voyager", Avanti West Coast Class 221 "Super Voyager", Class 390 "Pendolino" and London North Eastern Railway Class 801s can also be seen.

Service

The latter is operated by a Class 380 Desiro EMU.

On Sundays there is a two-hourly service to Edinburgh and Glasgow (six trains each way).

References

External links 

Railway stations in Edinburgh
Railway stations opened by British Rail
Railway stations in Great Britain opened in 1987
Railway stations served by ScotRail